Motumaoho is a small village in the Waikato region of New Zealand's North Island, just to the west of the Pakaroa Range. The village is bordered by the Waitakaruru Stream to the east. Motumaoho can be translated as an intruding clump of trees.

It once had a cheese factory, post office, railway station and garage, but now has only greenhouses, a school and houses. A hall was open at least from 1917 to 1928.

History 

The area was sparsely occupied by Ngāti Werewere of Ngāti Hauā. The nearest known archaeological site is just over the confiscation line and county boundary, about 5km towards Eureka, where a ringditch pā, Mangao Tupua, is on a small knoll at the foot of the Pakaroa Range.

Some early European traders are believed to have traversed the district prior to 1834, when the missionary, John Morgan, travelled up the Piako River and crossed to Horotiu. The 1860s saw an influx of European settlers to the area and, on 13 December 1873, a settler from Auckland, Thomas  Morrin, purchased Kuranui No.1 Block. In May 1874, he bought two further blocks,  Motumaoho No.1 and No.2, and hired Irish navvies from the gold fields to dig a network of ditches to drain the land, enabling it to be used for agriculture. In 1873 Motumaoho was described as being near Hangawera, a hill over 10km to the north, there being no other settlements in the area.

The other large holding in the area was Norfolk Downs. That estate was divided into smaller farms about 1911, after which there was some growth in the population.

Motumaoho Swamp 
A 1963 study found much of the vegetation on Motumaoho swamp, to the north of the railway, remained as it had when it built up the peat bogs over about 13,000 years, the two dominant species being giant wire rush and wire rush. However, since then, additional drains have been put in and, by 1998, Valentine Rd had been extended across the area.  The study also looked at Moanatuatua swamp, which became a scientific reserve in 1980. Floods still occur.

Cheese factory 
The centre of the village is dominated by the former cheese factory. A New Zealand Dairy Association dairy was built in 1910. The cheese factory was described as new in 1912, saying the Waikato Dairy Association's offer to build and run it was accepted. However, in 1929 the cheese factory had on its wall - Norfolk Coop Dairy Co estd. 1916. The Norfolk Co-operative Dairy Company was formed in 1915, with 22 suppliers. Electric power was connected in 1923, when a new factory was approved. It was working by 1924. Norfolk Co-operative Dairy Company, Limited merged into Morrinsville Co-operative Dairy Company, Limited in 1946. The factory closed in 1983. The derelict building remains and, between 2010 and 2014, a rusting Bedford OB bus was parked beside it.

Flax 
In 1926 Palmerston North-based flax miller, Fred Seifert, formed a company to develop  of former dairy and scrubland north of Motumaoho. He hoped to build a mill in 1929, but an old flax mill was demolished in 1928 and a shareholders tour in 1929 failed to raise capital, so no more was heard of the prothe eastect.

Soap 
In 1921 soap was being made from tallow.

Demographics 
By 1891 41 people were living in Motumaoho and, though the 1896 census recorded only 7, 215 were in the 1916 census. 

The SA1 area is part of the larger Tahuroa statistical area.

The SA1 area had a population of 183 at the 2018 New Zealand census, an increase of 9 people (5.2%) since the 2013 census, and a decrease of 9 people (−4.7%) since the 2006 census. There were 69 households, comprising 96 males and 90 females, giving a sex ratio of 1.07 males per female. The median age was 36.1 years (compared with 37.4 years nationally), with 42 people (23.0%) aged under 15 years, 36 (19.7%) aged 15 to 29, 87 (47.5%) aged 30 to 64, and 18 (9.8%) aged 65 or older.

Ethnicities were 90.2% European/Pākehā, 8.2% Māori, 1.6% Pacific peoples, and 3.3% Asian. People may identify with more than one ethnicity.

Although some people chose not to answer the census's question about religious affiliation, 57.4% had no religion, 29.5% were Christian, and 1.6% were Buddhist.

Of those at least 15 years old, 27 (19.1%) people had a bachelor's or higher degree, and 27 (19.1%) people had no formal qualifications. The median income was $43,500, compared with $31,800 nationally. 33 people (23.4%) earned over $70,000 compared to 17.2% nationally. The employment status of those at least 15 was that 87 (61.7%) people were employed full-time, 18 (12.8%) were part-time, and 6 (4.3%) were unemployed.

Tahuroa statistical area

Tahuroa statistical area had a population of 1,794 at the 2018 New Zealand census, an increase of 99 people (5.8%) since the 2013 census, and an increase of 213 people (13.5%) since the 2006 census. There were 624 households, comprising 918 males and 873 females, giving a sex ratio of 1.05 males per female. The median age was 37.1 years (compared with 37.4 years nationally), with 396 people (22.1%) aged under 15 years, 357 (19.9%) aged 15 to 29, 819 (45.7%) aged 30 to 64, and 222 (12.4%) aged 65 or older.

Ethnicities were 87.5% European/Pākehā, 12.0% Māori, 1.8% Pacific peoples, 4.0% Asian, and 1.7% other ethnicities. People may identify with more than one ethnicity.

The percentage of people born overseas was 11.0, compared with 27.1% nationally.

Although some people chose not to answer the census's question about religious affiliation, 51.3% had no religion, 37.8% were Christian, 0.3% had Māori religious beliefs, 0.3% were Hindu, 0.5% were Buddhist and 1.8% had other religions.

Of those at least 15 years old, 210 (15.0%) people had a bachelor's or higher degree, and 267 (19.1%) people had no formal qualifications. The median income was $40,100, compared with $31,800 nationally. 285 people (20.4%) earned over $70,000 compared to 17.2% nationally. The employment status of those at least 15 was that 807 (57.7%) people were employed full-time, 234 (16.7%) were part-time, and 42 (3.0%) were unemployed.

Education 
Motumaoho School is on SH26. In 1923 it had 70 children.

A request for a school was made in Parliament in 1910 and a one roomed school opened in 1912. In 1969 it was replaced by a school with a small library and a staff-room transported from Ohautira. Later changes added a library, which had been the Post Office, and a front deck.

Commerce 
Agriculture, at 56.9%, was the main occupation in 2013 in Tahuroa census area (to the west of Morrinsville, including Motumaoho).

Quarry 
The only other significant remaining occupation is quarrying. The quarry contains the index fossil, minotis, dating from the middle Jurassic, Norian age. The quarry was first developed for road stone by Piako County Council in 1924 on land they leased.

Transport

Road 
SH26 through the village was sealed in about 1929. Traffic volumes have increased from 4,397 in 2008 to 4,812 in 2015.

Railway 
It opened on 1 October 1884. By 1896 it had a shelter shed, platform and a passing loop for 27 wagons. By 1899 there was also a 4th class station building and urinals and in 1905 the loop was extended for 61 wagons. In 1912 Motumaoho became a tablet station and Railway houses were built in 1920. It had a goods shed and cattle yard, the latter built after 1936. Motumaoho closed to passengers on 31 July 1967 and to goods on 27 May 1973. The line is on a rising gradient from Morrinsville.

Incidents 
On 6 August 1959 Leslie George Kelly, an engine driver and Māori author, was killed in a head-on collision at Motumaoho. A wagon fell on the train crew after they'd jumped from their east-bound train.

Buses 
Local buses run to Morrinsville, Hamilton and, once a day to Paeroa via Te Aroha.

Pipeline 
A First Gas pumping station on Kurunui Rd is at the junction of pipelines linking the Māui pipeline at Te Kowhai with Cambridge and Waitoa.

Notable people 
Joan Hart, sprinter at the 1950 British Empire Games

References

External links 
2014 photo of dairy factory

Populated places in Waikato
Morrinsville